Homona bakeri is a species of moth of the family Tortricidae. It is found in the Philippines on the island of Luzon.

The larvae feed on Annona muricata.

Etymology
The species is named for the late Professor Charles Fidler Baker.

References

Moths described in 1968
Homona (moth)